The 2002–2004 European Nations Cup was the fourth edition of the newly reformed European Championship for tier 2 & 3 Rugby Union Nations. This was the second two-year cycled championship, the first to be planned from the start.

For the second division. the team was divided in two Pool . The winner of Pool "A" gain the promotion to 2004–2006 European Nations Cup First Division. There were no relegation, due the 2007 Rugby World Cup – Europe qualification

Pool A 
The highest level was the Pool "A", with five teams:
  relegated from first division at the end of previous edition.
  runner-up of the second round of qualification RWC 2003 valid also ad Second Division tournament.
  second in pool A of the same tournament.
  second in pool B of the same tournament.
  third in his pool of the same tournament and with better ranking respect the third of other group.

Table

  promoted to 2004–2006 European Nations Cup First Division

Results

First Season (2002–3)

Second Season (2003–2004)

Pool B 
The lowest Level was the Pool "B", with five teams:
  third in their pool of the second round of qualification RWC 2003
  fourth in pool A of the same tournament.
  fourth in pool B of the same tournament.
  fifth in his pool of the same tournament and with better ranking respect the fifth of other group.
  winner of the 2001–02 Third division

Table

First Season (2002–03)

Second Season (2003–04)

See also 
 2003–2004 European Nations Cup First Division
 2002–2003 European Nations Cup Third Division
 2003-2004 European Nations Cup Third Division

Sources

www.irb.com

2002–04
2002–03 in European rugby union
2003–04 in European rugby union
Germany at the European Nations Cup